Osmar Ibáñez Barba (born 5 June 1988), known simply as Osmar, is a Spanish professional footballer who plays for South Korean club FC Seoul as a defensive midfielder or a central defender.

Football career

Racing Santander
Born in Santoña, Osmar was a product of local Racing de Santander's youth system. After a successful loan stint with CD Salmantino in Tercera División he returned to his first club for 2008–09, making his senior debut with the reserves in Segunda División B and being his team's top scorer; he suffered relegation in the following season.

On 8 November 2009, Osmar made his debut with the Cantabrians' first-team, starting in a 2–0 La Liga home loss against Athletic Bilbao. He was definitely promoted to the main squad for the 2010–11 campaign, but appeared in only 12 more games in two seasons combined, with the second ending in relegation.

Buriram United
On 25 July 2012, Osmar signed a two-and-a-half-year contract with Thai club Buriram United F.C. for an undisclosed fee. He made his debut on 1 August, appearing in a Thai FA Cup match against Chonburi F.C. and going on to win both that tournament and the Toyota League Cup in his first year.

On 26 February 2013, Osmar made his debut in the AFC Champions League, in a match against Vegalta Sendai, acting as team captain and scoring a goal in the 1–1 away draw. On 1 May, Buriram became the first team from the nation in a decade to reach the knockout rounds of the AFC Champions League, and he topped his side's scorers list at three.

FC Seoul
On 31 December 2013, Osmar moved teams and countries again, joining FC Seoul on a three-year deal and becoming the first Spanish footballer to ever play in South Korea. Ahead of the 2015 season he was appointed vice-captain, appearing in the all matches and minutes to set a new record for a foreign field player in the K League 1.

Before the start of the following campaign, Osmar was chosen as the new captain, becoming the first foreigner in the club's history to hold the position. On 21 February 2018, he joined J1 League's Cerezo Osaka on loan.

On 18 December 2018, Osmar signed a new three-year contract with Seoul.

Career statistics

Honours
Buriram United
Thai Premier League: 2013
Thai FA Cup: 2012, 2013
Thai League Cup: 2012, 2013
Kor Royal Cup: 2013

FC Seoul
K League 1: 2016
Korean FA Cup: 2015

Individual
Fans' Asian Champions League XI: 2016
Thai Premier League: Defender of the Year, Best XI 2013
K League 1: Best XI 2016

Notes

References

External links

1988 births
Living people
People from Santoña
Spanish footballers
Footballers from Cantabria
Association football defenders
Association football midfielders
La Liga players
Segunda División B players
Tercera División players
Rayo Cantabria players
Racing de Santander players
Thai League 1 players
Buriram United F.C. players
K League 1 players
FC Seoul players
J1 League players
Cerezo Osaka players
Spanish expatriate footballers
Expatriate footballers in Thailand
Expatriate footballers in South Korea
Expatriate footballers in Japan
Spanish expatriate sportspeople in Thailand
Spanish expatriate sportspeople in South Korea
Spanish expatriate sportspeople in Japan